Mangalore Urban Development Authority (MUDA) is a city planning authority responsible for planning functions of the Indian city of Mangalore in Karnataka state.

Deputy commissioner of Dakshina Kannada holds the chairman position of MUDA.

History 
The "Mangalore Town Planning Authority" was established in 29 Nov 1965, later the organization was reestablished with the present name in the year 1988 by the Government of Karnataka under the Karnataka Urban Development Authority.

References 

Economy of Mangalore
State urban development authorities of India
State agencies of Karnataka